Anna Krzeptowska-Żebracka (26 July 1938 – 1 December 2017) was a Polish cross-country skier. She competed in the women's 10 kilometres at the 1960 Winter Olympics.

Cross-country skiing results

Olympic Games

References

External links
 

1938 births
2017 deaths
Polish female cross-country skiers
Olympic cross-country skiers of Poland
Cross-country skiers at the 1960 Winter Olympics
Sportspeople from Zakopane